Kryštof Kafan (born February 4, 1990) is a Czech former professional ice hockey player. He played nine regular season games with HC Litvínov in the Czech Extraliga. He also played in the Polska Hokej Liga for GKS Katowice, the FFHG Division 1 for Remparts de Tours and the English Premier Ice Hockey League for the Bracknell Bees.

References

External links

1990 births
Living people
Bracknell Bees players
Czech ice hockey forwards
Diables Noirs de Tours players
GKS Katowice (ice hockey) players
HC Litvínov players
HC Most players
People from Litvínov
HC Stadion Litoměřice players
Sportspeople from the Ústí nad Labem Region
Czech expatriate ice hockey people
Czech expatriate sportspeople in England
Czech expatriate sportspeople in France
Czech expatriate sportspeople in Poland
Expatriate ice hockey players in England
Expatriate ice hockey players in France
Expatriate ice hockey players in Poland